Saringosterol is an isolate of Lessonia nigrescens that has activity against Mycobacterium tuberculosis.

References

Sterols